Saluda Old Town Site is a historic archaeological site located near Saluda, Saluda County, South Carolina. Archaeological remains indicate the site was occupied between 5,000 and 2,000 years ago. It was the site of a town of the Saluda people of the late-17th and early-18th century.  On July 2, 1755, it was the site of a treaty signing recognizing the sovereignty of the King of England over all 360,000 square miles of Cherokee lands in South Carolina. In 1769, those lands formed the Ninety-Six District.

It was added to the National Register of Historic Places in 1972.

References

Archaeological sites on the National Register of Historic Places in South Carolina
Buildings and structures in Saluda County, South Carolina
National Register of Historic Places in Saluda County, South Carolina